Hatchet History: Ten Years of Terror is a compilation album. Released in 2002, the album is a retrospective featuring tracks from various rappers and bands that had signed to Psychopathic Records up until that point, including Insane Clown Posse, Twiztid, Anybody Killa, Blaze Ya Dead Homie,  Zug Izland, Myzery, Jumpsteady, and Dark Lotus.

Track listing

References

2002 compilation albums
Psychopathic Records compilation albums
Record label compilation albums